Alfred Schleusener tenement is a tenement located at 62 Gdańska Street in Bydgoszcz.

Location 

The building stands on the eastern side of Gdańska street, between Słowackiego street and Adam Mickiewicz Alley. 
It is adjacent to:
 Carl Meyer tenement at 60;
 Eduard Schulz Tenement at 66/68;
both historical buildings in Bydgoszcz.

History 

The edifice has been designed and built by Alfred Schleusener as a house for his own use, which address was then Danzigerstraße 137.

This type of realization (an architect building his own house) is pretty common in Gdańska Street , since other builders did the same at this time:
 Carl Meyer, at 60;
 Carl Rose, at 51;
 Fritz Weidner, at 34;
 Józef Święcicki, at 63.

The building has a distinctive urban character and was erected in 1910-1911. It had a residential wing distinct from the business and trade premises.

In the same area of Bydgoszcz, Alfred Schleusener has also realized :
 Tenement Carl Meinhardt at 27 Gdańska street, in 1909;
 Robert Grundtmann Tenement at 1 Słowackiego street, in 1906.

Architecture

The building has been realized in the style of early, classic modernism.

On the one hand, vertical elevations are highlighted as structural elements of the building by using strings loggias, balconies and bay windows. On the other hand, vertical divisions are highlighted using pilaster and friezes between windows.

Gallery

See also

 Bydgoszcz
 Gdanska Street in Bydgoszcz
 Alfred Schleusener
  Downtown district in Bydgoszcz

Bibliography

References

Buildings and structures on Gdańska Street, Bydgoszcz
Residential buildings completed in 1911
Modernist architecture in Bydgoszcz